Ofakilomaloma Swann is a Fijian lawyer and former politician. Originally from Vanua Balavu in the Lau archipelago, Swann served in the House of Representatives from 1999 to 2006, when she became Secretary of the Fiji Law Society.

Swann was noted for remaining loyal to the New Labour Unity Party (NLUP) after Kenneth Zinck, the only other NLUP candidate elected to Parliament, defied orders from the party and joined the Cabinet as Minister of Labour.  Swann remained on the Opposition benches, where she gained a reputation as a strong debater.

Policies and opinions 
Swann was regarded as a strong Fijian nationalist, but in a national rather than a racial sense.  She called for the British Union Flag to be removed from the Fijian flag, and for the observance of Queen's Birthday to be discontinued as a national holiday.  She also called for the removal of the portrait of Queen Elizabeth II from Fiji's currency.  Despite having been a republic since 1987, Fiji had kept, for cultural and historical reasons, many of the trappings of its old connection to the British Monarchy.  "These are just some of the things that disturb me considering our drive to take ownership of our country and make a statement about us being Fiji Islanders," she said on 8 August 2005.  It was time, she considered, to make a change.

In her dealings with other politicians, Swann was regarded as more moderate than many others, and was known to defend her rivals against unfair attacks.  On 23 September 2005, she defended Prime Minister Laisenia Qarase against claims of racism.  She said that such allegations were made by misinformed people, and that an analysis of government loans handed out to students, many of them Indo-Fijian, proved that he was not a racist.

1999 and 2001 elections 

Swann was elected to represent the Suva City Open Constituency in the House of Representatives in 1999 as a candidate of the United General Party (now the United People's Party), garnering 31.9% of the vote on the first count, and 56.2% after votes for minor candidates had been redistributed under Fiji's transferable voting system.  She retained the seat in 2001 as a candidate of the newly formed New Labour Unity Party (NLUP); this time the electorate was much more fractured and she polled only 12.5% of first-preference votes, but finished with 59.8% after the final distribution of preferences.

2006 election 

On 11 February 2006, the Fiji Sun quoted Swann as saying that as the NLUP had been deregistered, she was considering joining another party or contesting the upcoming election as an independent candidate.  She would announce a final decision after a round of meetings with her constituents starting in March, she said.  She reiterated on 23 February that she was still pondering her choices; she would confer with NLUP colleague Kenneth Zinck and others before making a final decision, Fiji Live quoted her as saying.  One option was to join the ruling Soqosoqo Duavata ni Lewenivanua (SDL), but was unsure whether she qualified as a candidate under the SDL constitution.  On 8 March, she announced that she had finally decided to run as an independent.  Running against several nationally known candidates, Swann was defeated, polling only 341 votes out of more than 12,000.

2006 coup 

A military coup deposed the Fijian government on 5 December 2006.  The new military authorities terminated Swann's membership of the board of the Civil Aviation Authority of Fiji on 14 December.

References

Year of birth missing (living people)
Living people
Ethnic minority members of the House of Representatives (Fiji)
New Labour Unity Party politicians
United Peoples Party (Fiji) politicians
Politicians from Vanua Balavu